Kukushkino is a rural locality (a khutor) in Mikhaylovka Urban Okrug, Volgograd Oblast, Russia. The population was 39 as of 2010. There are 2 streets.

Geography 
Kukushkino is located 65 km northeast of Mikhaylovka. Razdory is the nearest rural locality.

References 

Rural localities in Mikhaylovka urban okrug